The Men's 62 kg weightlifting event at the 2002 Commonwealth Games took place at the Manchester International Convention Centre on 30 July 2002.

Schedule
All times are Coordinated Universal Time (UTC)

Records
Prior to this competition, the existing world, Commonwealth and Games records were as follows:

Results

1 Madasamy originally won three silver medals (at snatch, clean & jerk and total), but was disqualified after he tested positive for Nandrolone.

References

Weightlifting at the 2002 Commonwealth Games